Lüderitz railway station is a railway station serving the town of Lüderitz in Namibia. It was erected in 1904.

Overview
It is part of the TransNamib Railway, and is the terminal of the currently decommissioned line to Aus which was completed in 1906. The extension to Seeheim was completed in 1908, and the connection to Windhoek and the central-eastern railway network in 1912.

See also
 Rail transport in Namibia

References 

Railway stations in Namibia
TransNamib Railway
Lüderitz
Railway stations opened in 1904
1904 establishments in German South West Africa